Music of Ghanaian Origin also known as MOGO is a celebration of music originating from Ghana. It started in 2007. It was initially an annual one-day event  but in 2015 was extended into a one-week festival and named MOGO Festival. An awards show was also instituted as part of the celebration. MOGO was created by Citi FM a Ghanaian radio station.

References

Music festivals in Ghana